Erwin Olaf Springveld (born 2 July 1959), professionally known as Erwin Olaf, is a Dutch photographer from Hilversum. Time magazine described his work as straddling "the worlds of commercial, art and fashion photography at once."

Biography 

Erwin Olaf Springveld was born on 2 July 1959 in Hilversum, Netherlands.

Olaf is most famous for his commercial and personal work. He has been commissioned to photograph advertising campaigns for large international companies such as Levi's, Microsoft and Nokia. Some of his most famous photographic series include "Grief", "Rain", and "Royal Blood". Never one to shy away from controversy, Olaf's work is often daring and provocative. Humorously however, one of his early photographs was once expelled from a show on the basis of not containing nudity.

His work has received many awards and he has held exhibitions around the world.

Olaf studied journalism in the School of Journalism in Utrecht. His work is shown in galleries and museums all around the world, for example at Wagner + Partner, Berlin; Flatland Gallery, Amsterdam; Hamiltons Gallery, London; Galerie Magda Danysz, Paris; Gallery Espacio Minimo, Madrid; and many others.

Olaf designed the 2014 Dutch euro coins with the portrait of King Willem-Alexander.

Exhibitions 
 2021:
 Munich Kunsthalle - Solo Exhibition: Unheimlich schön (irreally beautiful)
 2019:
 Anniversary Solo Show, Gemeente Museum The Hague & The Hague Museum of Photography, The Hague, The Netherlands
Palm Springs Unseen, Flatland, Amsterdam
 2017:
 Album 13 d'Indochine, Galerie Rabouan Moussin, Paris, France
 Human&Nature, Gallery Kong, Seoul, Republic of Korea
 2016:
 Erwin Olaf - Four Series, Centro de Arte Contemporaneo de Málaga, Málaga, Spain
 Cell of Emotions, National Art Gallery, Sofia, Bulgaria
 Homage Louis Gallait, The Pushkin State Museum of Fine Arts, Moscow, Russia
 2015:
 A Corps Perdu, Magda Danysz Gallery, Paris
 Erwin Olaf: The Empire of Illusion, Museo de Arte Contemporaine de Rosario, Rosario, Argentina
Waiting, Flatland, Amsterdam
 "Retrospective," Fondation Oriente Museu, Macau, Chine
 2014:
 Art & Fashion, Magda Danysz Gallery, Paris
 2013 :
 "Erwin Olaf - Berlin," Rabouan Moussion Gallery, Paris
 "Erwin Olaf - Waiting," Rabouan Moussion Gallery, Paris
 "Émotions - Installations," La Sucrière, Lyon
 "Berlin," Hasted Kraeutler Gallery, New York
 "Berlin," Hamiltons Gallery, Londres
 2012:
 The Dark Side, Rabouan Moussion Gallery, Paris
 "Works 2000 - 2010," Art Statements Gallery, Hong Kong 
 "Erwin Olaf," Kong Gallery, Séoul
 "Short Stories," Wagner Gallery, Berlin
 2011:
 "Erwin Olaf," Art Statements Gallery, Tokyo
 "Paradise the club," Rabouan Moussion Gallery, Paris 
 "High Tension," Carbon, Dubaï 
 "Captured senses," Cer Modern, Ankara 
 "Erwin Olaf," Nordic Light International Festival of Photography, Kristiansund
 2010:
 "Erwin Olaf Hotel," Magda Danysz Gallery, Paris 
 "Erwin Olaf Hotel," Paris-Benijing Gallery, Pékin
 "Erwin Olaf - Recent Work," Hamiltons Gallery, Londres
 "Hotel, Dawn & Dusk," Hasted Kraeutler Gallery, New York 
 2009 :
 Dusk, Flatland, Amsterdam
"Série Laboral Escena," Magda Danysz Gallery, Paris
 "Rain, Hope, Grief & Fall," Institut Netherlands, Paris
 "Darts of Pleasure," Domus Artium Museum, Salamanque
 "Moving Targets," Haifa Museum of Art, Haïfa

Honours 
National
Medal of Honour for Science and Arts (13 March 2023).

References

External links 

 Studio Erwin Olaf, official website
 Galerie WAGNER + PARTNER
 Magda Danysz Gallery 

1959 births
Living people
Dutch photographers
People from Hilversum
Dutch LGBT photographers
Dutch contemporary artists